Jožko Kavalar (born 9 May 1968) is a Slovenian cross-country skier. He competed in the men's 10 kilometre classical event at the 1992 Winter Olympics.

References

1968 births
Living people
Slovenian male cross-country skiers
Olympic cross-country skiers of Slovenia
Cross-country skiers at the 1992 Winter Olympics
People from the Municipality of Kranjska Gora